Newton Manly Young (June 2, 1892 – December 17, 1963) was a Canadian politician and barrister.

Young was born in Barrie, Ontario, Canada.  He was elected to the House of Commons of Canada as a Member of the historical Conservative Party in 1926 to represent the riding of Toronto Northeast. He served in World War I in France as a member of the 4th Battalion, Canadian Expeditionary Force.

External links 
 

1892 births
1963 deaths
Conservative Party of Canada (1867–1942) MPs
Members of the House of Commons of Canada from Ontario
People from Barrie